Legmoin is a department or commune of Noumbiel Province in south-eastern Burkina Faso. Its capital lies at the town of Legmoin.

References

Departments of Burkina Faso
Noumbiel Province